Russell was a provincial electoral division in the Canadian province of Manitoba. It was located in the southwestern section of the province.

Historical riding
The original Russell riding was created in 1886, shortly after the expansion of Manitoba's western boundaries.  It existed until 1957, when it was combined with the riding of Birtle as Birtle-Russell.  The riding was primarily agrarian, and elected candidates from various parties who supported agrarian interests.

List of provincial representatives

Modern riding
The riding of Birtle-Russell lasted from 1957 to 1979, and the subsequent riding of Roblin-Russell from 1979 to 1999. In 1999, the Roblin section of the riding was joined with Dauphin as Dauphin—Roblin, and a separate Russell riding was re-established. The riding was dissolved again in 2011.

The modern riding was bordered to the north by Dauphin—Roblin, to the east by Ste. Rose, to the south by Minnedosa and Arthur-Virden, and to the west by the province of Saskatchewan. The town of Russell was the main urban centre in this riding, which also included Birtle, Inglis, Angusville, Rossburn, Erickson, Oakburn, Shoal Lake and Hamiota. The Riding Mountain National Park and Asessippi Provincial Park were also located in Russell.

The riding's population in 1996 was 18,647. In 1999, the average family income was $39,999, and the unemployment rate was 6.10%. Russell remained primarily an agrarian riding, with agriculture accounting for 32% of its industry. Fourteen per cent of the riding's residents were aboriginal, and a further 13% were Ukrainian. The riding also had the second-highest percentage of senior citizens in Manitoba, at 21% of the total.

The last MLA was Len Derkach of the Progressive Conservative Party, who held the riding of Roblin-Russell from 1986 to 1999. The New Democratic Party made serious inroads in the riding before its dissolution.

Following the 2008 electoral redistribution, the riding was renamed Riding Mountain and expanded to include parts of the riding of Minnedosa. This change took effect for the 2011 election.

List of provincial representatives

Electoral results

1886 general election

1888 general election

1892 general election

1896 general election

1899 general election

1903 general election

1907 general election

1910 general election

1911 by-election

1914 general election

1915 general election

1920 general election

1922 general election

1927 general election

1932 general election

1935 by-election

1936 general election

1941 general election

1945 general election

1949 general election

1953 general election

1999 general election

2003 general election

2007 general election

References

Former provincial electoral districts of Manitoba